Sphingomonas fennica is a bacterium from the genus of Sphingomonas which has been isolated from groundwater, which was collected near a sawmill in Finland.

References

Further reading

External links
Type strain of Sphingomonas fennica at BacDive -  the Bacterial Diversity Metadatabase	

fennica
Bacteria described in 2007